Sarah Pape (born 8 August 1972) is a Canadian rower. She competed in the women's eight event at the 2004 Summer Olympics.

References

External links
 

1972 births
Living people
Canadian female rowers
Olympic rowers of Canada
Rowers at the 2004 Summer Olympics
Rowers from Toronto
21st-century Canadian women